Ryan McGarry (born 1986) is an Irish hurler who played as a goalkeeper for the Antrim senior team.

McGarry joined the panel during the 2004 National League and eventually became the first-choice goalkeeper until his retirement after the 2009 championship. During that time, he won one Christy Ring Cup medal as a non-playing substitute and three Ulster medals.

At club level, McGarry plays with McQuillans, Ballycastle.

References

1986 births
Antrim inter-county hurlers
Ballycastle McQuillan hurlers
Hurling goalkeepers
Living people
Ulster inter-provincial hurlers